The list of ship commissionings in 1914 includes a chronological list of all ships commissioned in 1914.


See also 

1914
 Ship commissionings